Manolis Kalomiris (December 14, 1883, Smyrna – April 3, 1962, Athens) was a Greek classical composer. He was the founder of the Greek National School of Music.

Biography
Born in Smyrna, he attended school in Constantinople and studied piano and composition in Vienna. After working for a few years as a piano teacher in Kharkov (then Russia and now Ukraine) he settled in Athens. An admirer of Richard Wagner, Rimsky-Korsakoff, Kostis Palamas, and Nikos Kazantzakis, he set himself the life goal of establishing a Greek "national school" of music, based on the ideas of the Russian national composers, on western musical achievements and on modern Greek folk music, poetry and myth. He thus founded in 1919 the Hellenic Conservatory and in 1926 the National Conservatoire. At the same time, he served as the General Supervisor of military bands in the country. He wrote three symphonies and five operas, one piano concerto and one violin concertino, other symphonic works, chamber music and numerous songs and piano works. He held various public posts and was elected member of the Academy of Athens.

A passionate composer, he has a post-romantic idiom characterised by rich harmonies and orchestrations, complex counterpoints, long eastern melodies, and the frequent use of Greek folk rhythms. A preoccupation with love and death transcends all five of his music dramas.

References 

1883 births
1962 deaths
Smyrniote Greeks
People from Aidin vilayet
20th-century classical composers
Greek classical composers
Greek classical musicians
Greek National School
Members of the Academy of Athens (modern)
Greek opera composers
Male classical composers
20th-century Greek people
20th-century male musicians
19th-century Greek musicians
20th-century Greek musicians
Military musicians
Emigrants from the Ottoman Empire to Greece